Georges Bilot (12 May 1885 – 9 February 1964) was a French footballer who played as a midfielder and defender. He played in the first match of the history of the France national team, a 3–3 draw against Belgium on 1 May 1904. At club level, he played for FC Paris.

References 

1885 births
1964 deaths
Footballers from Paris
French footballers
Association football midfielders
Association football defenders
CA Paris-Charenton players
France international footballers